The Bennington Fish Hatchery, also known as the Bennington Fish Culture Station, is a state-operated fish hatchery at 110 Hatchery Road in Bennington, Vermont, USA. The station, the state's largest, produces a variety of trout, which are used to stock the state's water resources.  Its facilities, dating to 1916, are listed on the National Register of Historic Places. The station has a visitors' center that is open daily.

Description
The Bennington Fish Culture Station is located southeast of downtown Bennington, on the east side of South Stream Road, which generally parallels South Stream, a north-flowing tributary of the Walloomsac River.

Buildings of the complex include several that date to the hatchery's founding as an experimental station in 1916. These include the original superintendent's office and residence, which now serves as its visitors' center, and the main hatchery building, a handsome Colonial Revival structure, both of which were completed in 1917.

The fishery currently produces stocks of brown trout, brook trout and rainbow trout, which are distributed to Vermont's lakes and ponds.

History
The station was established by the state on an experimental basis in 1916, after an earlier experimental station in Arlington was found inadequate. This one was made permanent after the quality and reliability of its water sources was assured. It grew to become a model fish hatchery by the 1930s, distributing thousands of pounds of fingerlings and fry throughout the state. Its facilities were significantly expanded in the 1940s with funding from the Works Progress Administration.

See also

National Register of Historic Places listings in Bennington County, Vermont

References

External links
Bennington Fish Culture Station at Vermont Fish and Wildlife

Historic districts on the National Register of Historic Places in Vermont
Colonial Revival architecture in Vermont
Buildings and structures completed in 1916
Buildings and structures in Bennington, Vermont
National Register of Historic Places in Bennington County, Vermont
Fish hatcheries in the United States